The following notable people were educated at The Hall School, Hampstead.

 Alfred Alvarez, poet and novelist
 Peter Asher, singer and actor
 Andrew Russell, 15th Duke of Bedford, landowner and peer 
David Michael John Bennett AO QC – Solicitor-General of Australia; Barrister; Queen's Counsel of all Australian States 
 Simon Cadell, actor
 Jamie Catto, musician and film-maker
 Simon Clarke, sociologist
 Giles Coren, food critic and novelist
 Sir David Croom-Johnson, judge
 Richard Michael Durbin FRS, computational biologist
 Mark Durden-Smith, TV presenter
 Ben Fogle, adventurer, broadcaster and writer 
 Sir Clement Freud, politician
 James Harding, journalist and head of BBC News
 Oscar Humphries, journalist
 John Kampfner, political journalist
 James Klugmann, Communist intellectual 
 David Lascelles, 8th Earl of Harewood, film producer 
 Sir Oliver Letwin MP; Minister of State for Policy from May 2010; Cabinet Minister with responsibility for the Cabinet Office from 2015
 Nick Mason, drummer at rock band Pink Floyd
 David Neuberger, former President of the Supreme Court of the United Kingdom
 Oliver Sacks, famed neurologist
 Michael Sellers, actor son of Peter Sellers
 Sir Peter Shaffer, playwright
 Jeremy Sinden, actor son of Sir Donald Sinden
 Sir Stephen Spender English poet, novelist and essayist
 Richard Talbot Kelly, MBE, MC, RI, soldier and artist
 Lionel Wigram, film producer and screenplay writer
 Miles Jupp, actor and comedian

Notes

Hall School (Hampstead)